Carmelita Jeter (born November 24, 1979) is a retired American sprinter, who competed in the 60 metres, 100 m and 200 m. For over a decade, between 2009 and 2021, Jeter held the title as "Fastest woman alive" after running a 100 m personal best of 10.64 seconds at the 2009 Shanghai Golden Grand Prix. In the 100 m, she was the 2011 world champion and the 2012 silver medalist. She is also a three-time Olympic medallist.

She won the 100 m bronze at the 2007 World Championships in Athletics and a gold at the World Athletics Final. She won a second World Championship bronze. Her personal best of 10.64 s makes her the fourth fastest woman ever in the 100 m, behind Florence Griffith Joyner's long-standing world record, Elaine Thompson-Herah's 10.54 seconds and Shelly-Ann Fraser-Pryce's 10.60 seconds.

Early life
Jeter attended Bishop Montgomery High School in Torrance, California. Initially, basketball was the preferred sport in her family, and her younger brother, Eugene, later joined the Sacramento Kings. Her basketball coach suggested that she try out track, and an 11.7-second run confirmed her natural talent for sprinting. Jeter graduated from California State University, Dominguez Hills, which is located in Carson, California, with a bachelor's degree in physical education. Jeter set the record for most NCAA medals by a CSUDH track athlete and became the university's first U.S. Olympic Trials qualifier. A recurring hamstring problem kept her out of competition for much of 2003–05, and it was not until 2007 that she made her first impact in senior track and field athletics, having undergone treatment with deep tissue massage.

International success

In 2007, Jeter won a silver medal in the 60 meters at the USA Indoor Track and Field Championships with a personal best of 7.17 seconds, and she remained in good form, improving her 100 m best to 11.04 seconds to take fourth place in the 100 m at the Adidas Track Classic. Building upon this, she qualified for her first major competition by finishing third at the national championships behind Torri Edwards and Lauryn Williams. She went on to win the bronze medal at the World Championships in a personal best time of 11.02 seconds, as well as taking the 100 m gold at the 2007 World Athletics Final.

The following year, she competed at the 100 and 200 m U.S. Olympic trials. Although she set a 100 m best of 10.97 seconds in the quarter-finals, she did not progress beyond the semifinals, finishing just two hundredths out of the qualifying positions. A sixth-place finish in the 200 m meant she had not made the 2008 Summer Olympics team, despite being one of the favourites for selection. She qualified for the 100 and 200 m races at the 2008 World Athletics Final, but only managed fourth and fifth place, respectively. She changed coach in November, deciding to work with John Smith, who had previously coached athletes such as Maurice Greene. Smith began completely remodelling Jeter's running style.

In her 2009 season, she showed strong performances going into the 2009 World Championships in Athletics. She ran 7.11 seconds in the 60 m in the indoor season, the fastest by any athlete that year and a personal best. She remained in-form in her outdoor season, recording a fast 10.96 seconds at the Mt. SAC Relays, winning gold at the 2009 Nike Prefontaine Classic, and taking her first national title at the 2009 U.S. Outdoor Championships. At the 2009 London Grand Prix, she placed first in the 100 m, clocking a personal best of 10.92; it was the third-fastest time at that point of the season, only slower than Jamaica's Shelly-Ann Fraser and Kerron Stewart. A week prior to the start of the World Championships, Jeter was part of a United States 4 × 100 m relay team that ran the fastest women's sprint relay in twelve years. Lauryn Williams, Allyson Felix, Muna Lee, and Jeter finished with a time of 41.58 seconds, bringing them to eighth on the all-time list.

At the 2009 World Athletics Championships, in Berlin, Jeter was one of the favorites for the gold medal as a 10.83-second personal best in the semis made her the fastest qualifier for the final. She ended up with her second World Championship bronze medal in the 100 m, however, finishing a tenth of a second behind Fraser and Stewart. The races after the championships proved more successful: she beat strong opposition in the IAAF Golden League meets in Zurich and Brussels with two sub-10.90 runs.

Jeter was also selected to run as part of the US relay team as the anchor runner. However, in their heat, during the change over between Alexandria Anderson and Muna Lee, Lee horrifically injured her leg which caused elimination from the relay event. Jamaica eventually claimed the gold medals.

She entered the 2009 IAAF World Athletics Final having won her last three races by a significant margin. Even taking this into account, Jeter surprised with one of the highlights of the final edition of the IAAF World Athletics Final. She won the 100 m race in Thessaloniki, Greece with a time of 10.67, to become the third fastest woman in history and set a championship record. This was the fastest run in twelve years; a time which had only been bettered by Marion Jones and Florence Griffith-Joyner, and 0.16 seconds faster than Jeter had ever run before. She ran even faster a week later at the Shanghai Golden Grand Prix, winning in 10.64 seconds (the fourth fastest time ever) to become the second fastest woman outright.

Her fast times were a double-edged sword in that they brought as much suspicion as they did appreciation. At age 30, Jeter had improved her personal record by over a third of a second within a single season and she ranked between Jones and Griffith-Joyner in the all-time lists. Given the history of the women's sprints and speculation about performance-enhancing drug use, Jeter said "I can't be upset about those questions [but] It's unfortunate that I work this hard and I don't get the credit I should get". She improved her 60 m best to 7.02 seconds to win at the USA Indoor Track and Field Championships. This was still slower than LaVerne Jones-Ferrette, and Jeter resolved to improve further for the 2010 IAAF World Indoor Championships.

She retired in 2017 after injury prevented her from competing in the 2016 Olympics.

Personal bests

All information from IAAF profile.

References

External links

Carmelita Jeter officially names 4x100 world record "Breaking Point"
Diolase 10 Laser Therapy case study for Carmelita Jeter

1979 births
Living people
Track and field athletes from Los Angeles
American female sprinters
African-American female track and field athletes
Olympic gold medalists for the United States in track and field
Olympic silver medalists for the United States in track and field
Olympic bronze medalists for the United States in track and field
Athletes (track and field) at the 2012 Summer Olympics
Medalists at the 2012 Summer Olympics
World Athletics Championships athletes for the United States
World Athletics Championships medalists
World Athletics Indoor Championships medalists
World Athletics record holders (relay)
California State University, Dominguez Hills alumni
Diamond League winners
USA Outdoor Track and Field Championships winners
USA Indoor Track and Field Championships winners
World Athletics Championships winners
IAAF World Athletics Final winners
Cal State Dominguez Hills Toros
Olympic female sprinters
21st-century African-American sportspeople
21st-century African-American women
20th-century African-American sportspeople
20th-century African-American women
20th-century African-American people